Juliette-Joséphine Simon-Girard (8 May 1859 – 1954) was a French soprano, principally in operetta. Her father, was an actor at the Comédie Française, and her mother was Caroline Girard, of the Opéra-Comique.

Career
Girard was born at Paris.  After studies at the Conservatoire in 1876 (in the class of Henri de Régnier) she made her debut at the Théâtre des Folies-Dramatiques as Carlinette in Offenbach's La foire Saint-Laurent on 10 February 1877, and then became an overnight star by creating the role of Serpolette in Les cloches de Corneville on 19 April 1877. During the run of Les cloches de Corneville she met and married the well-known tenor Simon-Max, thereafter becoming Mme Simon-Girard.

At the age of 19, she created the title role in Offenbach’s Madame Favart; then La fille du tambour-major in 1879 becoming one of Paris’s most popular performers, prominent on the city's stages for 30 years.

At the Folies-Dramatiques she also created roles in Beau Nicolas (1880), Les poupées de l'infante (1881), Fanfan la tulipe (1882), La princesse des Canaries (1883); moving to the Théâtre des Nouveautés she was in the premiere of La vie mondaine. On return to the Folies-Dramatiques she replaced Ugalde in Les petits mousquetaires and then created the title role in La fauvette du temple (17 November 1885). 
After singing with her husband in the premiere of La chatte blanche, at the Théâtre du Châtelet on 2 April 1887, she spent a year in Belgium which included the premiere of Lecocq's Ali-Baba.

Simon-Girard’s return to Paris was at the Théâtre de la Gaîté in 1888 in revivals of Le grand Mogul and La fille du tambour-major, before creating the title role in Voyage de Suzette on 20 January 1890. After several productions at the Théâtre de la Renaissance (where she created Mlle Asmodée in 1891 and La femme de Narcisse in 1892, and revived La jolie parfumeuse in 1892, she went back to the Folies-Dramatiques and created Eva in Varney’s Miss Robinson on 17 July 1892.
 
From 1893, she was at the Théâtre des Bouffes Parisiens with more premieres including Olga in Pessard's Mam'zelle Carabin (3 November 1893). 
She met her second husband Félix Huguenet while performing in L’enlèvement de la Toledad in 1894, and from then on took on more comedy acting parts.

In November 1899 she took the title role at the Théâtre des Variétés in a major and successful revival of La belle Hélène, which ran for over five hundred performances.

In 1903, Simon-Girard made recordings of songs from Offenbach operettas (Barbe-bleue, Belle Hélène, Madame Favart, La Jolie Parfumeuse, La Périchole and La Grande-Duchesse), excerpts from Les cloches de Corneville, and songs by Messager, Audran and Lecocq.

She died at Nice.  Her son was Aimé Simon-Girard.

References

1859 births
1954 deaths
Singers from Paris
Conservatoire de Paris alumni
French operatic sopranos
19th-century French women opera singers
20th-century French women opera singers